The following is a list of colleges and universities in the Chicago metropolitan area.

Community and junior colleges

Public institutions
City Colleges of Chicago 
Harold Washington College
Kennedy–King College
Malcolm X College
Olive–Harvey College
Richard J. Daley College
Truman College
Wilbur Wright College
College of DuPage (Glen Ellyn, Illinois)
College of Lake County (Grayslake, Illinois)
Elgin Community College (Elgin, Illinois)
Harper College (Palatine, Illinois)
Joliet Junior College (Joliet, Illinois)
McHenry County College (Crystal Lake, Illinois)
Moraine Valley Community College (Palos Hills, Illinois)
Morton College (Cicero, Illinois)
Oakton Community College (Des Plaines and Skokie, Illinois)
Prairie State College (Chicago Heights, Illinois)
South Suburban College (South Holland, Illinois)
Triton College (River Grove, Illinois)
Waubonsee Community College (Sugar Grove, Illinois)

Private institutions
MacCormac College (Chicago, Illinois)

Colleges granting bachelor's degrees and above
American Academy of Art (Chicago)
Columbia College Chicago (Chicago)
Flashpoint Chicago (Chicago)
Hebrew Theological College (Skokie, Illinois)
Lake Forest College (Lake Forest, Illinois)
Moody Bible Institute (Chicago)
North Central College (Naperville, Illinois)
St. Augustine College (Chicago)
School of the Art Institute of Chicago (Chicago)
Telshe Yeshiva (Chicago)
Trinity Christian College (Palos Heights, Illinois)
VanderCook College of Music (Chicago)
Wheaton College (Wheaton, Illinois)

Universities and graduate schools

Public institutions 

 Chicago State University (Chicago)
 Governors State University (University Park, Illinois)
 Northeastern Illinois University (Chicago)
Northern Illinois University (DeKalb, Illinois)
University of Illinois Chicago (Chicago)

Private institutions 

Aurora University (Aurora, Illinois)
Benedictine University (Lisle, Illinois)
Concordia University Chicago (River Forest, Illinois)
DePaul University (Chicago)
Dominican University (River Forest, Illinois)
East–West University (Chicago)
Elmhurst University (Elmhurst, Illinois)
Illinois Institute of Technology (Chicago and Wheaton, Illinois)
Judson University (Elgin, Illinois)
Kendall College (Chicago)
Lewis University (Romeoville, Illinois)
Loyola University Chicago (Chicago)
Midwestern University (Downers Grove, Illinois)
National Louis University (Chicago)
National University of Health Sciences (Lombard, Illinois)
North Park University (Chicago)
Northwestern University (Evanston, Illinois and Chicago)
Resurrection University (Chicago, Evanston)
Roosevelt University (Chicago)
Saint Xavier University (Chicago)
Trinity International University (Deerfield, Illinois)
University of Chicago (Chicago)
University of St. Francis (Joliet, Illinois)
University of Saint Mary of the Lake (Mundelein, Illinois)

Programs, graduate- and professional-only

Business
Booth School of Business (Chicago)
Kellogg School of Management (Chicago, Evanston, Miami)
Kellstadt Graduate School of Business (Chicago)
 Quinlan School of Business (Chicago)
Lake Forest Graduate School of Management (Lake Forest, Illinois)
Liautaud Graduate School of Business (Chicago, public)
Stuart School of Business (Chicago)

Law
Chicago-Kent College of Law (Chicago)
DePaul University College of Law (Chicago)
Loyola University Chicago School of Law (Chicago)
Northern Illinois University College of Law (DeKalb, public)
Northwestern Pritzker School of Law (Chicago)
UIC John Marshall Law School (Chicago, public)
University of Chicago Law School (Chicago)

Medical, dental and healthcare
Chicago College of Osteopathic Medicine (Chicago)
Feinberg School of Medicine (Chicago)
Illinois College of Optometry (Chicago)
Midwestern University (Downers Grove)
Pritzker School of Medicine (Chicago)
Rosalind Franklin University of Medicine and Science (North Chicago, Illinois)
Rush University (Chicago)
Stritch School of Medicine (Maywood)
UIC College of Pharmacy (Chicago, public)
University of Illinois at Chicago College of Dentistry (Chicago, public)
University of Illinois College of Medicine (Chicago, public)

Religious and theological
Bexley Seabury (Chicago)
Catholic Theological Union (Chicago)
Chicago Theological Seminary (Chicago)
Christian Life College (Mount Prospect, IL)
Garrett–Evangelical Theological Seminary (Evanston, Illinois)
Lutheran School of Theology at Chicago (Chicago)
McCormick Theological Seminary (Chicago)
Meadville Lombard Theological School (Chicago)
North Park Theological Seminary (Chicago)
Northern Seminary (Lisle, Illinois)
Spertus Institute for Jewish Learning and Leadership (Chicago)

Social science
Adler University (Chicago)
The Chicago School of Professional Psychology (Chicago)
Erikson Institute (Chicago)
Institute for Clinical Social Work (Chicago)

Technology and other areas
Knowledge Systems Institute (Skokie)
Toyota Technological Institute at Chicago (Chicago)

For-profit
    
American InterContinental University (Schaumburg)
Chamberlain University (Addison)
Coyne College (Chicago)
DeVry University (Chicago)
Fox College (Bedford Park and Tinley Park)
Illinois Center for Broadcasting (Chicago, Lombard)
Midwest College of Oriental Medicine (Chicago)
Northwestern College (Chicago, Bridgeview)
Pacific College of Oriental Medicine (Chicago)
Rasmussen University (Aurora, Mokena, Romeoville)
Taylor Business Institute (Chicago)
Universal Technical Institute (Lisle)
University of Phoenix (Schaumburg)

Defunct
American Conservatory of Music (1886–1991, Chicago)
Argosy University (2001–2019, Chicago, Schaumburg)
Barat College (1858–2005, Lake Forest, Illinois)
Bush Conservatory of Music (1901–1932, Chicago)
Central YMCA College (1922–1945, Chicago)
The Chicago Conservatory College (1857–1981, Chicago)
Chicago Technical College (1904–1977, Chicago)
Evanston College for Ladies (1871–1873, Evanston, Illinois), merged with Northwestern University in 1873
Everest College (Bedford Park, Burr Ridge, Melrose Park, Merrionette Park, North Aurora, Skokie)
George Williams College (1890–2000), merged its Wisconsin campus into Aurora University
Harrington College of Design (1931-2015, Chicago)
Illinois Institute of Art – Chicago (1916–2018, Chicago)
Illinois Institute of Art – Schaumburg (1983–2018, Schaumburg)
Illinois Technical College (1950–1992, Chicago)
International Academy of Design & Technology – Schaumburg (1977–2015)
ITT Technical Institute (1969–2016, Arlington Heights, Oak Brook, Orland Park)
La Salle Extension University (1908–1982, Chicago)
Le Cordon Bleu College of Culinary Arts in Chicago (1983-2017, Chicago)
Lexington College (1977–2014, Chicago)
 Mallinckrodt College (1916–1991, Wilmette), merged with Loyola University Chicago
Mundelein College (1930–1991, Chicago) merged with Loyola University of Chicago
Old University of Chicago (1856–1886, Chicago)
Robert Morris University Illinois (1913–2020, Chicago), merged into Roosevelt University in 2020
Sanford–Brown (1920-2017, Chicago)
Shimer College (1853–2017, Mount Carroll, Waukegan, Chicago), merged with North Central College in Naperville in 2017
Solex College (1995–2018, Chicago, Wheeling) 
Westwood College (1953–2016, Calumet City, Chicago, Woodridge)

See also
List of colleges and universities in Illinois

References

External links
Department of Education listing of accredited institutions in Illinois

Chicago-related lists
Illinois education-related lists
Chicago